The surname Mussafia, Musafia, or Musaphia, or Mussaphia may refer to:

Adolf Mussafia (1835–1905), Austrian philologist from Dalmatia
Benjamin Musaphia (c. 1606 – 1675), Jewish doctor, scholar and kabbalist
Dimitri Musafia, artisan maker of violin and viola cases
Ḥayyim Yitzḥak Mussafia (1760–1837), Talmudist
Joseph Musaphia (born 1935),  a New Zealand writer and actor
Julien Musafia (1925–2015), American pianist and musicologist

See also
Mussaf
Mussafah